Nia Burks (born 1984) is an American artist working with the mediums of video, performance and sound.  Her work incorporates popular culture, found footage, social media and pole dance elements. She investigates new media theory and gender theory. Burks is also the owner of Butter and Filth, a pole dancing studio and school. She currently lives in Richmond, Virginia.

Education 

Burks attended Virginia Commonwealth University graduating in 2006 with a BFA in Sculpture. She received an MA in Digital Media from Maryland Institute College of Art in 2007 and an MFA from Virginia Commonwealth University’s Photography and Film Department in 2009.

She is currently a professor at Virginia Commonwealth University teaching in the Kinetic Imaging department.

Burks has also been the artist-in-residence at Takt Kunsteproject in Berlin.

Career  

Burks is a professor at Virginia Commonwealth University and is also the owner of Butter and Filth. The first Butter and Filth opened in February of 2018 at Hull Street, Richmond, Virginia. Burks and then co-owner, Heather Williams, moved Butter and Filth to 4840 Waller Road in Unit 310, where it currently resides.

Exhibitions 

Burks' work has been featured in numerous shows worldwide. Her work has also been featured on Rhizome at the New Museum and Creativity Online’s “Pick Of The Day” shortly after the creation of Angry Gamers in 2010.

Selected Shows 
 Symbiotic Output, Berlin Germany, 2011
 Three Inch Canvas, Jyväskylä Art Museum, 2011
 Irresistible Apparatus, Studio 8 West, Richmond, Virginia, 2010
 New Media, Sex and Culture in the 21st Century, Museum of New Art, Detroit Michigan, 2010
 Glitch Festival, Chicago, Illinois, 2010
 Sex Cells, 3rd Ward, Brooklyn, New York, 2009

References 

1984 births
Living people
American artists